Goddard is an unincorporated community in Fleming County, Kentucky, United States. Goddard Bridge, which is listed on the National Register of Historic Places, is located in Goddard.

The post office opened in 1881 as Sandford, but was renamed Goddard in 1902, after Joseph Goddard. The post office was discontinued in 1958.

References

Unincorporated communities in Fleming County, Kentucky
Unincorporated communities in Kentucky